
Year 261 BC was a year of the pre-Julian Roman calendar. At the time it was known as the Year of the Consulship of Flaccus and Crassus (or, less frequently, year 493 Ab urbe condita). The denomination 261 BC for this year has been used since the early medieval period, when the Anno Domini calendar era became the prevalent method in Europe for naming years.

Events 
 By place 
 Roman Republic 
 The Romans, determined to win control of Sicily from Carthage, build a fleet based on the model of a captured Carthaginian quinquereme.

 Seleucid Empire 
 The new Seleucid king Antiochus II reaches an agreement with the king of Macedonia, Antigonus II Gonatas, to work together in trying to push Ptolemy II's fleet and armies out of the Aegean Sea. With Macedonia's support, Antiochus II launches an attack on Ptolemaic outposts in Asia Minor.

China
 The armies of the State of Qin and State of Zhao contest control of the area around Changping. After suffering defeats to general Wang He of Qin and the superior Qin army, general Lian Po of Zhao refuses to give battle, resulting in a stalemate.

Births

Deaths 
 Antiochus I Soter, Greek king of the Hellenistic Seleucid Empire

References